Trinidad and Tobago has a unique history and its food is influenced by Indian-South Asian, West African, Creole, European, American, Chinese, Amerindian, and Latin American  culinary styles. Trinidad and Tobagonian food is dominated by a wide selection of seafood dishes, most notably, curried crab and dumplings. Trinidad and Tobago is also known for its prepared provisions, such as dasheen (taro root), sweet potato, eddoe, cassava, yam, soups and stews, also known as blue food across the country. Corresponding to the Blue Food Day event held annually in Trinidad and Tobago.

Main meals

Breakfast dishes

Popular breakfast foods include doubles; roti (usually sada roti) served with a variety of curried, roasted or fried vegetable dishes; fried bake served with saltfish, meat, or vegetable dishes; and coconut bake (coconut bread) served with a range of fillings.

Doubles is made with two baras (flat fried dough) and curried channa (chickpeas) and is served with toppings, like pepper sauce, kuchela, and tamarind, mango, pommecythere, cucumber, and bandhaniya chutneys. It is one of the most popular breakfast foods eaten on the islands, however, it is eaten at any time throughout the day.

A traditional Indo-Trinidadian and Tobagonian breakfast consists of sada roti, a type of unleavened bread made with flour, baking powder and water. The dough is rolled out and cooked on flat, cast-iron skillet, called a tawa. The cooked dough is cut into quarters and served with a variety of fried vegetables, tarkaris or chokhas. Sometimes fried bake is eaten instead and is made using with flour, baking powder and yeast and is then fried in oil. Usually breakfast is vegetarian, however salt fish is sometimes added. Some breakfast dishes include baigan chokha (roasted and mashed eggplant), damadol chokha (roasted and mashed tomatoes), pepper chokha (roasted and mashed peppers), aloo chokha (boiled, roasted, and mashed potatoes), karaili chokha (roasted and mashed bittermelon), murtani or upar ghar (combination of roasted and mashed eggplant, tomato, pepper, and okra), fried or curried bodi (long beans), fried or curried aloo (potatoes), fried or curried ochro/bhindhi (okra), fried or curried seim (hyacinth beans), fried or curried karaili (bittermelon), pumpkin or kohra  tarkari (pumpkin simmered with spices and seasoning), fried or curried saijan (drumstick), fried or curried lauki (bottle gourd), bhaji (made with young dasheen bush (taro) leaves, spinach leaves, saijan (drumstick) leaves, or chaurai (spiny amaranth) leaves), and/or fried plantains.

Fried bake (a fried unleavened bread) is usually served with fried shark, saltfish (dried and salted cod), buljol (saltfish with fresh sweet peppers, tomatoes, cucumbers and sometimes boiled eggs), sardines, herring (smoked, salted, and dried fish), bacon, fried plantain, brown stew chicken, or corned beef with onions and tomatoes.

Coconut bake (coconut bread) is usually served with fried accra (saltfish fritters), buljol, black pudding, butter, cheese paste (a mixture of cheese, butter, mustard, grated onion, mayonnaise and green seasoning) or stewed meat, like chicken.

Bake and shark is a popular breakfast dish at local beaches, like Maracas Beach (Trinidad) and Store Bay (Tobago), especially on the weekend.

Other breakfast foods include tannia cakes (fried dasheen cake), and boiled cassava with butter.

Common hot drinks consumed for breakfast include cocoa tea (hot chocolate) made from homemade cocoa balls, cornmeal porridge and farine (an amerindian treat).

Lunch and dinner

A very popular and nationally well known dish with distinctly African roots is callaloo, a side dish made of young dasheen or taro leaves, okra known locally as ochro, crab or pigtails, pumpkin, onions, coconut milk, pimento, and green seasoning like chives, cilantro and culantro (locally called chadon beni from the French name for Cnicus thistle "Chardon Bénit" or bandhaniya from the Hindi name for closed cilantro "ban dhaniya").

Callaloo is often served with cornmeal coo coo, plantain, cassava, sweet potatoes, dumplings, rice, and curried crab.

This callaloo dish is not the same as Jamaican callaloo which is made with amaranth leaves, onions, garlic and tomatoes.

Pelau is a very popular rice-based dish in Trinidad and Tobago, as well as stewed chicken, breadfruit oil down, macaroni pie, ox-tails, dhal and rice, among many others.

Trinidad and Tobago dishes are often curried, stewed, or barbecued. An array of fish and seafood can be bought at local merchants throughout Trinidad and Tobago, such as flying fish, king fish, carite, prawns, sapatay, red fish, shrimp, bonito, lobster, conch and crab, tilapia and seasonal cascadura.

One of the most popular Trinidadian dishes is curried duck served with either roti or rice. Local curried duck cooking competitions are often held with multiple variations being created. A simple dish to make, but difficult to master, curried Muscovy is regarded as a delicacy which can be served at all times.

A popular Trini dish is macaroni pie, a macaroni pasta bake, with eggs and cheese, and a variety of other potential ingredients that can change according to the recipe being used.

Tobagonian food is dominated by a wide selection of seafood dishes, most notably, curried crab and dumplings, and Tobago is also known for its sumptuously prepared provisions, such as dasheen (taro root), sweet potato, eddoe, cassava, yam, soups and stews, also known as blue food across the country. "Fish broth" a soup made in the style of Bouillabaisse is quite popular as a main dish or as a side.

Another local dish is the rare delicacy cascadu (cascadura), which is a small, freshwater fish. The fish is curried and served with lagoon rice and cassava and yams. There is a local legend in Trinidad that s/he who eats cascadu will return to Trinidad to end their days.

Condiments

Trinidadians accompany their meals with various condiments; these can include pepper sauces, chutneys and pickles and are often homemade.

Pepper sauces are made by using scotch bonnet or other hot peppers, either minced or chopped and other spices. It can sometimes include lime or lemon as well as other vegetables, and come in many variations and flavours. The murtanie (mother-in-law) is another popular condiment which is a coarsely chopped spicy medley of scotch bonnet peppers, carrots, karaili (bitter melon) and other spices.

Chutneys are popular as well and often include chaltar (dillenia indica), mango, tamarind, cucumber, pommecythère, bandhaniya, dhaniya, tomato, and coconut. They are most commonly eaten with doubles, aloo pie, saheena, baiganee, kachori, and pholourie. There are a variety of popular pickles known locally as Achar which are commonly used. Kuchela a grated spicy version, usually made from mango but sometimes made from pommecythère, the Mango version being most popular. Other version of Achars are made from mango, pommecythère, tamarind, amla, lemon, lime, and chulta.

Green seasoning is extremely popular, a cold sauce based on culantro or chadon beni, pureed with green onions, garlic, pimento, vinegar, and other herbs, which can be used as a table condiment or marinade.

Street foods

Popular freshly prepared street foods include:

 Indo-Trinidadian and Tobagonian foods like doubles, aloo pie, pholourie, saheena, baiganee, bara, and kachori are popular street foods throughout the country. Another Indo-Trinidadian and Tobagonian street food that is popular is wrap roti, which consists of roti (usually paratha or dhalpuri) that wraps curried vegetables, curried channa (chickpeas) and aloo (potatoes), curried chicken, curried shrimp, curried goat, curried duck, curried conchs, or any other spicy fillings. Indian sweets are also popular, especially around Hindu holidays. Debe in South Trinidad is a popular destination for these foods. 
 Bake and shark (most popular at Maracas Beach along the north coast of Trinidad) is a fried dish that is topped with fresh fruit like pineapple;  vegetables like cucumber and salad; and a variety of sauces and seasonings.
 Souse is made from pig, cow or chicken feet or cucumbers and seasoned with onion, garlic, salt, pimento, scotch bonnet peppers, lemon and chadon beni. It is served warm (mostly) or slightly chilled (room temperature). It is also rumoured to be a cure to hangovers.

Other common street foods include wontons, corn soup, geera (cumin) pork, geera chicken, kebabs, gyros, pasteles, raw oysters (usually sold at stalls where there is a lighted kerosene torch or flambeau, with a spicy sweet/hot sauce mainly with cilantro or bandhaniya aka shadon beni aka culantro), fish pies, macaroni pies, cheese pies, beef pies (many Trinidadian neighbourhoods boast a local pie-man), and pows (Cantonese pao-tzu < baozi, steamed wrapped roll with savoury or sweet filling – steamed buns filled with meat, typically char siu pork). Sausage rolls are also eaten as midday snacks and are available at stands usually found along the nation's streets.

When in season, roast and boiled corn on the cob can be found any time day or night.

On festive occasions (Carnival, Borough Day and most public holidays), street foods also include wild meat such as deer, iguana, manicou (phalangeriformes), tatou (armadillo), and agouti, to name a few. These are prepared either as a creole or curry dish, and served with a wide choice of local pepper sauces.

On hot days, locals enjoy ice cream, snow cones (served in various colours, flavours and shapes, often sweetened with condensed milk), ice pops, kulfi, freezies, sucker bag, coconut slushies, coconut water, and fresh coconut jelly.

Festival foods

Special Christmas foods include appetisers like pastelles (called hallaca in Venezuela where they originated), pholourie, saheena, baiganee, kachori, and chicken or pork pies. Entrees include garlic ham (carne vinha-d'alhos, a Portuguese dish), baked ham, baked turkey or chicken, macaroni pie, fish pie, garlic roasted potatoes, grilled or barbecued meat (chicken, shrimp, fish, or lamb), corn, pigeon peas, Christmas (also called Spanish or festive) rice, fried rice, chow mein, lo mein, Chinese roast chicken, pepper shrimp, different types of curries (chicken, goat, duck, fish, shrimp, crab, baigan, channa and aloo), roti, and dal bhat (rice). Desserts include fruitcake, blackcake (rum cake), sweet bread, cassava pone, coconut drops, sponge cake, chocolate cake, Dundee cake, raisin/currants roll, khurma, and gulab jamun. Drinks include soda, coconut water, juices (mango, orange, or cranberry), ginger beer, ponche crema, egg nog, cocoa tea, and sorrel.

Traditional Diwali and other Hindu festivals and prayers foods include appetizers such as pholourie, saheena, baiganee, bara, and kachori. Main dishes include roti (most commonly dalpuri and paratha) and  karhi and rice served with condiments such as achar or anchar, kuchela, mother-in-law (pickled vegetables), pepper sauce, and dishes such as curried mango, bhaji (dasheen bush or any spinach), pumpkin or kohra tarkari (pumpkin), curry channa and aloo (chickpeas and potatoes), fried or curried baigan (eggplant), fried or curried bodi (long beans), fried or curried seim (hyacinth beans), curry eddoes, curry chataigne or katahar (breadnut), and other tarkaries (vegetarian curries). Desserts include mohan bhog (parsad), lapsi and suhari, burfi, khurma, gulab jamun, pera, rasgulla, batasa, gujiya, gulgula, roat, kheer (sweet rice), laddu, and jalebi. It is traditionally served on a sohari (Calathea lutea) leaf.

Special Eid, Hosay, and other Muslim festival foods include curry goat, curry channa and aloo, sawine, burfi, rasgulla, sirnee, maleeda, halwa, and baklawa.

Sweets
The popular local desserts are usually extremely sweet. Local snacks include cassava or coconut pone and stewed guavas, sweetbread, paw paw balls, tamarind balls, bene balls (sticks or cakes), toolum, guava cheese (guava paste), jub jub and sugar cakes, nut cake, chilli bibi and brown sugar fudge. Local chocolatiers and confectioners manufacture several different types of sweet treats. Indian delicacies like kheer (sweet rice or meetha bhat), sawiyan, khurma, gulab jamoon, roat, laddu, jalebi, halwa, mohan bhog (parsad), sirnee, lapsi and suhari, rasgula, gulgula, rasmalai, pera, modak, doodhpitty, gujiya, batasa, and burfi are also popular.

Beverages

There are many different popular beverages in Trinidad. These include, various sweet drinks [sodas] (Chubby's, Busta, LLB (Lemon Lime and Bitters), Solo, Peardrax, Coca-Cola, Fanta, Pepsi, Dr. Pepper, and Sprite), Malta, Smalta, Shandy, citrus juice, ginger beer, Guinness Beer, peanut punch, channa (chickpea) punch, beet punch, sorrel, mauby, seamoss punch, barbadine punch, soursop punch and paw paw punch.

Carib and Stag beers are very popular local lager beers. There is also Carib Light and Carib Shandys, which come in Sorrel, Ginger, and Lime flavours.

Coconut water can be found throughout the island. Rum was invented in the Caribbean, therefore Trinidad and Tobago boasts rum shops all over the island, serving local favourites such as ponche-de-crème, puncheon rum, and home-made wines from local fruits.
Homemade alcohol is popular also.
Bitters (especially the one made by House of Angostura) is also popular.

Pacro water is a seafood-based beverage made from boiling various chiton mollusks, such as chiton tuberculatus but also has other culinary uses, such as in broths for soup. The beverage has a reputation as an aphrodisiac, as well as having other therapeutic properties. Pacro water can sometimes be found at festivals or public celebrations.

Fruits
Fruits available in Trinidad include mangoes (e.g. Axe, Bread, Bastapool, Button, Belly-bef, Calabash, Cedar, Cutlass, Doudouce, Egg, Graham, Bombay, Ice Cream, Julie, Long, Pawpaw, Peter, Rose, Round, Spice, Starch, Tommy, Teen, Turpentine, Vert, Zabrico), breadfruit, sorrel (roselle), passion fruit, watermelons, sapodilla (Manilkara zapota), pommerac (Syzygium malaccense), guavas, pommecythère (Spondias dulcis), caimite (star apple), abiu, five fingers (carambola), cherries, zaboca (avocado), pawpaw (papaya), chenette (Melicoccus bijugatus), pineapples, oranges, Portugal (tangerines of various genetic breeding), plum (Governor, King and common variety), West Indian (Barbadian) cherry (Acerola), bananas (sikyé, silk, Gros Michel, Lacatan), barbadine (granadilla), balatá, soursop, cashews, tamarind, Ceres (Flacourtia indica), Pois Doux, Cocorite (Attalea maripa), Gru-Gru-beff (Acrocomia aculeata), Fat-Pork (Chrysobalanus icaco), pears, and coconuts (several varieties).

Many fruits available in Trinidad and Tobago are commonly used in a savory and usually spicy delicacy broadly referred to as "chow". The main ingredients of chow are usually: the fruit of choice, culantro (bandhaniya), pepper (powdered, sauce or natural form), salt and sometimes garlic and vinegar. Traditionally, the most popular fruits for chow have been mangoes, pommeracs, pommecythère, cucumbers, tomatoes, cherries, pineapples, green apples, pears, and plums.

The fruits are "seasoned" by the rest of the base ingredients and larger fruits (like mango and pineapple) are usually cut up into bite-sized pieces.

See also

Caribbean cuisine
Caribbean Chinese cuisine

References

 
Caribbean cuisine